Gengwa is a village in the Sankuru province of the Democratic Republic of the Congo.

References

Populated places in Sankuru